George Farah (born 1978) is an American author, attorney, pro-democracy activist and political commentator.

Background 

Farah was born in Beirut, Lebanon on 1978 and moved to the United States.

In 2000, Farah graduated from Princeton University with a B.A. in the Woodrow Wilson School of Public and International Affairs. In 2005, he graduated from Harvard Law School with a J.D. He was the recipient of a Paul & Daisy Soros Fellowship for New Americans.

Farah lives in New York City.

Career

Presidential debates 

U.S. News & World Report described Farah as a "political debate expert and election watch dog." PBS called Farah a "remarkable" author who exposed the "secretive process by which party handlers ensure there won't be a real discussion of the issues" at the presidential debates.

Farah is the author of the book No Debate: How the Republican and Democratic Parties Secretly Control the Presidential Debates, which was published by Seven Stories Press in 2004. Farah is also the founder and executive director of the non-profit organization Open Debates, which advocates reform of the presidential debate process.

In his book, Farah describes how negotiators for the Republican and Democratic nominees draft secret contracts that dictate the terms of the presidential debates. Those contracts, argues Farah, contain antidemocratic provisions that weaken debate formats and exclude third-party challengers. Through his investigative work, Farah secured copies of the 1992, 1996 and 2004 contracts and made them public for the first time, spurring criticism of the major parties for manipulating the debates.

Farah has repeatedly criticized the Commission on Presidential Debates, a private corporation which has sponsored every general election presidential debate since 1988. Farah argues that the Commission on Presidential Debates was created by the Republican and Democratic parties to "seize control of the presidential debates from the League of Women Voters." Farah claims that the Commission implements and conceals the debate contracts negotiated by the major party campaigns.

To reform the presidential debates, Farah advocates replacing the bipartisan Commission on Presidential Debates with a "truly nonpartisan" Citizens' Debate Commission that would operate transparently, employ challenging formats and adopt democratic candidate selection criteria. In 2004, Farah persuaded multiple newspapers and more than 60 civic organizations to endorse the Citizens' Debate Commission. In 2012, Farah helped convince three corporations to withdraw their sponsorship of the Commission on Presidential Debates.

Political commentator 

Farah has published many opinion articles addressing electoral reform issues, wage inequality, media concentration and foreign policy in the Middle East. His articles have appeared in numerous newspapers and periodicals, including The Washington Post, The Boston Globe, The Philadelphia Inquirer, The Denver Post, Christian Science Monitor, Extra! Magazine, and The Las Vegas Review-Journal.

Farah has been interviewed on many television programs to discuss presidential elections, Supreme Court decisions, and Middle East conflicts. He has appeared on ABC's Nightline, PBS's NOW with Bill Moyers, ABC's 20/20, CNN's Lou Dobbs Tonight, MSNBC's Countdown, Fox News' Fox & Friends, CBS Evening News, CNN's American Morning, MSNBC's Lester Holt Live, Al-Jazeera's Inside Story, and C-Span's Washington Journal.  Al-Jazeera retained Farah to provide on-site analysis of the presidential debates in 2012.

Farah has also been interviewed on many radio shows, including NPR's All Things Considered, WNYC's The Brian Lehrer Show, Democracy Now!, and CounterSpin.

Farah has given several talks about the political process and the need for electoral reform at colleges and universities.

Class-action attorney 

Farah is a co-founder and partner at the law firm Handley Farah & Anderson, where he litigates antitrust, wage theft, consumer and civil rights cases on behalf of plaintiffs. He has brought antitrust class actions on behalf of small businesses and farmers that were overcharged due to price-fixing conspiracies; represented unions and consumers in class actions against pharmaceutical companies that monopolized drug markets and thwarted generic competition; and represented workers in claims against construction companies and military contractors that failed to pay minimum wages or disability benefits.

In addition, Farah has represented victims of global human rights abuses, including political asylum applicants.

Farah was previously a partner at the law firm Cohen Milstein. Before that, he worked at The Center for the Study of Responsive Law, where he researched the commercial influence on political talk shows and the impacts of the IMF's structural adjustment programs.

Living wage advocacy 

Farah has campaigned for the passage of legislation that would raise the minimum wage to a living wage. He served as general counsel and treasurer of the Campaign for a Living Wage, which advocated for municipalities to adopt living wages in government contracts. He has published opinion pieces in newspapers encouraging adoption of living wage legislation.

In addition, Farah has filed lawsuits seeking damages on behalf of those who were allegedly deprived of fair wages.  He has represented dairy farmers in class actions against processors that allegedly conspired to depress wages, and he has represented Holocaust survivors in actions against companies who profited from Nazi-era slave labor.

Farah has also volunteered with other progressive nonprofit groups. He volunteered as counsel for Tenants and Workers United to support their affordable housing campaign; served as a Trustee of the Hopkins House, which provides education programs to children from low-income families; and volunteered as a regional coordinator for MoveOn.org to facilitate the election of Democrats to Congress.

Publications

Book 
 "No Debate: How the Republican and Democratic Parties Secretly Control the Presidential Debates," Seven Stories Press (2004), 232 Pages,

Articles 
 "Prominent Market Definition Issues in Pharmaceutical Antitrust Cases," Antitrust Magazine, Fall 2015 (Co-authored with Laura Alexander)
 "Commission Prevents Debates from Informing," Las Vegas Review Journal, September 9, 2012
 "Debates Could Be A Whole Lot Better," The Denver Post, October 13, 2008
 "A Moral and Economic Case for a 'Living Wage' Law," The Washington Post, May 4, 2006 (Co-authored with Clayton Sinyai)
 "The Debate Debacle," The Boston Globe, September 18, 2004 (Co-authored with Jesse Ventura)
 "No Debate: Format's a Sham," Fort Lauderdale Sun-Sentinel, August 30, 2004 (Co-authored Tom Gerety)
 "Save 'Genuine' Presidential Debates," Christian Science Monitor, August 10, 2004
 "Get Debates Out of Parties' Grasp," Philadelphia Inquirer, November 14, 2003
 "What's Not Talked About on Sunday Morning?" Extra! Magazine, October 2001, Cover Story (Co-authored with Justin Elga)

References 

American male writers
American political activists
American people of Lebanese descent
1978 births
Living people
American lawyers
Harvard Law School alumni
Princeton School of Public and International Affairs alumni